Aymer de Lusignan may refer to:
 Aymer de Valence (c. 1222 – 1260), bishop of Winchester.
 Aymer de Valence, 2nd Earl of Pembroke (c. 1275 – 1324), Anglo-French nobleman, nephew of the above.